FindLaw is a business of Thomson Reuters that provides online legal information and online marketing services for law firms. FindLaw was created by Stacy Stern, Martin Roscheisen, and Tim Stanley in 1995, and was acquired by Thomson West in 2001.

FindLaw.com is a free legal information website that helps consumers, small-business owners, students and legal professionals find answers to everyday legal questions and legal counsel when necessary. The site includes case law, state and federal statutes, a lawyer directory, and legal news and analysis.

It also includes a free legal dictionary and magazine called Writ, whose contributors (mostly legal academics) argue, explain and debate legal matters of topical interest.

FindLaw offers website development and Internet advertising services for legal professionals and extended members of the legal community through lawyermarketing.com.

In 2010, following the 2009 acquisition of the solicitor recommendation service Contact Law, FindLaw launched FindLaw UK (www.findlaw.co.uk), a website for businesses and individuals in the UK looking for information on legal topics or a solicitor.

References

External links
 FindLaw Home Page
 FindLaw Australia
 FindLaw UK
 FindLaw Canada

Thomson Reuters
West (publisher)
American legal websites
Law firms established in 1995
Internet properties established in 1995
Web portals